Darlaston Urban District was a local authority which existed within the West Midlands conurbation, England from 1894 until 1966. It was centred on the township of Darlaston in the Black Country, and also incorporated the villages of Bentley and Moxley.

The authority ceased to exist in 1966 when, along with the majority of the neighbouring Willenhall Urban District and parts of the Wednesbury Urban District, it became part of Walsall County Borough, later Metropolitan Borough of Walsall.

Walsall
Urban districts of England
Districts of England created by the Local Government Act 1894